Ship Island is a barrier island off the Gulf Coast of Mississippi, one of the Mississippi–Alabama barrier islands. Hurricane Camille split the island into two separate islands (West Ship Island and East Ship Island) in 1969.   In early 2019, the US Army Corps of Engineers completed the first stage of a project rejoining the two islands and recreating one Ship Island.  Ship Island is the site of Fort Massachusetts (built 1859–66), as a Third System fortification.  Part of the island is included in the Gulf Islands National Seashore.

History 

Having the only deep-water harbor between Mobile Bay and the Mississippi River, the island served as a vital anchorage for ships bearing explorers, colonists, sailors, soldiers, defenders and invaders. The French, Spanish, British, Confederate and Union flags have all flown over Ship Island.

French explorer Pierre Le Moyne d'Iberville charted Ship Island on 10 February 1699,
which he used as a base of operations in discovering of the Mississippi River. The island served as a point of immigration to French colonies in the New World.  Some immigrants died upon arrival at Ship Island, and their bodies were burned in a furnace.

In 1702, the island was named Ile aux Vaisseaux  (the French phrase for "Ship Island") due to its protected deepwater anchorage. After New Orleans was founded (1718) to the west, the island served as the principal port of entry from Europe for French colonists from 1720 until 1724. The island was given to Great Britain by France at the end of the Seven Years' War in 1763. In 1783, at the end of the American Revolution, Great Britain transferred the island to Spain.

The United States, as part of the Louisiana Purchase, claimed the island in 1810.

In the War of 1812, Admiral Sir Alexander Cochrane anchored between Ship Island and Cat Island with a fleet of fifty British warships and 10,000 soldiers in preparations for the Battle of New Orleans and the island was used as a launching point for British forces.

In 1849, the U.S. Navy anchored at Ship Island to discourage assembly of mercenaries on nearby islands for paramilitary invasion of Cuba.

In 1853, the island's first lighthouse was built. It was made of brick and mortar.

In 1858, Mississippi passed legislation that gave jurisdiction over the island to the United States government. After the war, Congress approved an ambitious plan to construct state-of-the-art masonry fortifications at strategic locations along the Atlantic and Gulf coasts, including Ship Island. Construction of a fort on the island began in 1859, and continued up to the Civil War when the Confederates named the uncompleted structure Fort Twiggs after Confederate General David E. Twiggs.  The island later became a prison for Confederate prisoners of war, and a base for the U.S. Second Regiment (Louisiana Native Guards led by Colonel Nathan W. Daniels), a unit composed of African-American soldiers. On July 9, 1861, a twenty-minute cannon exchange between Confederates in Fort Twiggs and the screw steamer  occurred. Ship Island was abandoned by the Confederates because it could not be adequately garrisoned. The USS Massachusetts returned and took possession of Ship Island in September 1861. According to the historian John D. Winters, the island was "a valuable base from which to break up the traffic of the small Confederate vessels plying between Mobile and New Orleans through Mississippi Sound."

In 1862, the fort was renamed Fort Massachusetts in honor of the Union warship which had seized the abandoned outpost. Construction on Fort Massachusetts was halted in 1866, although the fort was not fully completed.

The January 4, 1862, edition of  Harper's Weekly describes Ship Island:

In 1880, the island was designated as the country's first quarantine station. The fort closed in 1903, and the quarantine station was placed on reserve status in 1916.

In 1886, a wooden lighthouse was built to replace the brick lighthouse erected in 1853, which was damaged by waves.

During World War II, the Coast Guard used the island for anti-submarine beach patrol. In 1942, the Army Air Corps used the quarantine station as a military recreation facility, as did Keesler Air Force Base in 1955.

In 1969, Hurricane Camille with its  tidal surge cut Ship Island into two distinct islands, to form East Ship Island and West Ship Island. The gap was known as the Camille Cut. 

In 1972, the original 1886 wooden lighthouse was accidentally burned down by campers.

In 1998, Hurricane Georges washed away a mile of East Ship Island's beach.

In 1999, Friends of Gulf Islands National Seashore dedicated a commemorative reproduction of the 1886 wooden lighthouse.

In August 2005, Hurricane Katrina almost completely submerged East Ship Island. West Ship Island received most of the developed property damage as Katrina's  tidal surge wiped out the visitor and employee facilities on the island, as well as the island's pier and boardwalk. These facilities included offices and sleeping quarters for National Park Service staff, public restrooms and showers, and the public concessions building. Fort Massachusetts received minimal damage and was soon reopened to the public. The pier and boardwalk were rebuilt as well. Temporary restrooms and a small concessions trailer were on the island while new facilities were rebuilt. The reproduction of the 1886 lighthouse was reduced to rubble.

In 2008, Ship Island was surveyed just 2 weeks after Hurricane Ike.  Scientists had a difficult time finding the island.  The eastern half of the island had completely disappeared, leaving only parts of the western half.  It is unknown whether the island was eroded by Hurricane Ike, or if erosion occurred when Hurricane Gustav hit just 2 weeks earlier.

In April 2009, the rebuilding of the island's ranger station, restrooms, visitor center and snack bar washed away by Hurricane Katrina began and was scheduled to be completed in the Fall of 2009. As part of this rehabilitation, parts of Fort Massachusetts damaged by Hurricane Katrina are also being repaired.

In June 2010, containment booms encircled the island in an attempt to protect it from oil leaking from the Deepwater Horizon oil spill.

In early 2019, the US Army Corps of Engineers completed the  project to rejoin the two islands, eliminating Camille Cut.

Activities 
Today, Ship Island serves as a tourist destination.  Activities include fishing, swimming, and tours of Fort Massachusetts.

Access 

Ship Island is accessible through private or chartered boat. It is also accessible by a privately owned ferry boat company, Ship Island Excursions, running from Gulfport, Mississippi 12 miles (19 km) out to the island for a fee. Ship Island Excursions has been running boats to the island since before the National Park Service acquired the island. Today, they are an official Park Service Concession.

References

External links

 Ship Island Excursions
 Gulf Islands National Seashore - Official NPS site

Barrier islands of Mississippi
History of Louisiana
American Civil War sites
Protected areas of Harrison County, Mississippi
Deepwater Horizon oil spill
Gulf Islands National Seashore
Landforms of Harrison County, Mississippi